Near Eastern Archaeology is an American journal covering art, archaeology, history, anthropology, literature, philology, and epigraphy of the Near Eastern and Mediterranean worlds from the Palaeolithic through Ottoman periods. The journal is written for a general audience and is published quarterly by the American Schools of Oriental Research. The current editor is Thomas Schneider. Almost all articles undergo peer review prior to publication. The journal is electronically archived by JSTOR with a three-year moving wall.

The Biblical Archaeologist (1938-1997) 
The journal was established in 1938 by archaeologist George Ernest Wright as The Biblical Archaeologist, out of "the need for a readable, non-technical, yet thoroughly reliable account of archaeological discoveries as they are related to the Bible...".

In 1998 it was renamed Near Eastern Archaeology, to reflect the publication's broader geographic, chronological, and intellectual scope.

See also 
Near Eastern Archaeology
Near Eastern bioarchaeology

References

External links 
 

Publications established in 1938
Publications disestablished in 1997
History journals
Quarterly journals
English-language journals
Archaeology journals
Ancient Near East journals
Defunct journals of the United States